"Surfing with the Alien" is the title track from Surfing with the Alien, the second studio album by guitarist Joe Satriani, released in 1987 through Relativity Records.

The song refers to the comic book character, Silver Surfer. The song was considered the 30th greatest guitar solo ever by readers of Guitar World magazine, and is one of Satriani's most prominent shred-style tracks. It is included as downloadable content in the "Guitar Virtuoso Track Pack" for the 2007 music video game, Guitar Hero III: Legends of Rock, and a downloadable single for the Rock Band game series.

Satriani made the melody one morning he went to record. He plugged a wah-wah pedal and a Tubedriver into his 100-watt Marshall and he decided to use an Eventide 949s. Then they recorded the song and the solo in about half hour. But the Eventide broke down and they couldn't recreate the original effect. They decided to leave the original version and make another one.

Charts

References

1987 songs
1980s instrumentals
Joe Satriani songs
Songs about comics
Songs about fictional male characters